The 1990 Big East Conference baseball tournament was held at Muzzy Field in Bristol, Connecticut. This was the sixth annual Big East Conference baseball tournament. The fourth seeded Connecticut Huskies won their first tournament championship and claimed the Big East Conference's automatic bid to the 1990 NCAA Division I baseball tournament.

Format and seeding 
The Big East baseball tournament was a 4 team double elimination tournament in 1990. For the first time, the conference played as a single division, so the top four teams were seeded one through four based on conference winning percentage only. In previous seasons, the top two teams in each division squared off in the field.

Bracket

All-Tournament Team 
The following players were named to the All-Tournament Team.

Jack Kaiser Award 
Craig MacDonald was the winner of the 1990 Jack Kaiser Award. MacDonald was a second baseman for Connecticut.

References 

Tournament
Big East Conference Baseball Tournament
Big East Conference baseball tournament
Big East Conference baseball tournament
College baseball tournaments in Connecticut
Bristol, Connecticut
Sports competitions in Hartford County, Connecticut